Dagon is an ancient Semitic god.

Dagon may also refer to:
 Dagon, name used by Josephus for Dok, ancient fortress near Jericho
 Dagon (butterfly), a butterfly genus
 Dagon (novel), a 1968 novel by Fred Chappell
 Dagon (Cthulhu Mythos), a deity in H. P. Lovecraft's Cthulhu Mythos
 "Dagon" (short story), a 1917 short story by H. P. Lovecraft
 Dagon (film), a 2001 film based on H. P. Lovecraft's novella The Shadow over Innsmouth
 Dagon (Dungeons & Dragons), a deity in Dungeons & Dragons
 Dagon, California, a town in Amador County, California, USA
 Dagon International, a Burmese conglomerate
 Dagon Township, a neighborhood of Yangon, Myanmar
 Dagon University, a university in Yangon
 Dagon (planet) or Fomalhaut b, an exoplanet
 Nightrider (DC Comics) or Dagon, a DC Comics character
 The Dagons, a psychedelic band from Los Angeles
 Mehrunes Dagon, the main villain in ''The Elder Scrolls IV: Oblivion

See also
 Dagan (disambiguation)
 Dogon (disambiguation)
 Dragon (disambiguation)
 Dagoman